Tang Weixing (born 15 January 1993) is a Chinese professional go player. He has won three international titles, with two championships in the Samsung Cup (2013, 2019) and one in the Ing Cup (2016).

Early life
Tang Weixing was born in Guiyang, Guizhou in 1993. His name is related to Go: The wei in his name, taken from his mother's surname, is a homophone of the wei in weiqi, while the xing in his name, meaning 'star', is in reference to the star points on a Go board. He began to learn Go when he was 5 years old. At the age of 7, he moved to Beijing with his father to further pursue his study of Go.

As an amateur player, he won two consecutive Chinese amateur Go championships at the 2004 and 2005 . He was China's representative at the 2006 World Amateur Go Championship, where he finished in second place. He earned professional 1 dan rank that same year, at age 13.

Career
In 2013, Tang won the 18th Samsung Cup, his first international championship, defeating Lee Sedol 2–0 in the finals. Tang, who was 3 dan at the time, was promoted to 9 dan with the victory. His win capped off a year in which Chinese players swept every major international Go tournament. He finished as the runner-up in the 19th Samsung Cup in 2014, with a 2–0 loss to the champion Kim Ji-seok.

In 2016, he won his second international title in the 8th Ing Cup, beating runner-up Park Junghwan 3–2. He was the 22nd Samsung Cup runner-up in 2017, with a 2–1 loss to Gu Zihao. In 2019, he defeated Yang Dingxin to win the 24th Samsung Cup, marking his seventh consecutive quarterfinals appearance, fourth finals appearance, and second title at the Samsung Cup. He played his sixth major international title match in the 13th Chunlan Cup in 2021, and lost 2–0 to Shin Jin-seo.

Promotion record

Career record

2006: 0 wins, 2 losses
2007: 11 wins, 8 losses
2008: 16 wins, 9 losses
2009: 17 wins, 11 losses
2010: 28 wins, 17 losses
2011: 29 wins, 22 losses
2012: 48 wins, 31 losses
2013: 56 wins, 30 losses
2014: 40 wins, 30 losses
2015: 34 wins, 25 losses
2016: 39 wins, 33 losses
2017: 29 wins, 27 losses
2018: 32 wins, 31 losses
2019: 17 wins, 24 losses
2020: 5 wins, 6 losses

Total: 401 wins, 306 losses (56.7% winning percentage)

Titles and runners-up

Head-to-head record vs selected players
 

Players who have won international go titles in bold.

 Shi Yue 12:13
 Ke Jie 7:11
 Park Junghwan 7:9
 Fan Tingyu 8:6
 Yang Dingxin 8:6
 Tan Xiao 5:9
 Mi Yuting 4:10
 Gu Zihao 4:8
 Wang Haoyang 5:6
 Jiang Weijie 3:8
 Chen Yaoye 1:10
 Tong Mengcheng 7:3
 Kim Jiseok 4:6
 Tuo Jiaxi 6:4
 Li Xuanhao 6:3
 Lian Xiao 6:3
 Peng Liyao 5:4
 Choi Cheolhan 6:2
 Fan Yunruo 7:1
 Dang Yifei 4:4
 Wang Xi 4:4
 Gu Lingyi 5:2
 Zhong Wenjing 5:2
 Huang Yunsong 2:5

References

External links

1993 births
Living people
Chinese Go players